Gerardo Guevara (born 23 September 1930) is one of the key composers in Ecuador. His work combines native music with contemporary techniques.

Biography
Born in Quito, Gerardo Guevara showed music ability at an early age. Because his father worked as a caretaker at the Conservatorio Nacional, Guevara used to eavesdrop on the music dictations that were being given to older children and sometimes ventured to shout the answer before running away. When he was fifteen he started studying composition with Luis H. Salgado. In 1952, while playing the piano in an orchestra in Guayaquil, he studied composition and the analysis of Bartok's music with the Hungarian musician Jorge Aq

From 1959 onwards and thanks to a Unesco grant, Guevara studied composition with Nadia Boulanger at the École Normale de Musique de Paris where he graduated as a conductor. While in Paris, he also studied musicology at the University of La Sorbonne. After twelve years in France, he went back to Ecuador where in 1972 he formed the choir of the Central University of Quito. A year later, he created the Sayce (Society for the protection of musicians).

He acted as a conductor of the National Symphony Orchestra from 1974–75 and director of the Conservatorio Nacional (1980–88) where he taught composition and the history of Ecuadorian Music.

Mainly nationalist he nonetheless explored contemporary techniques, which led Robert Stevenson to write: "Guevara Viteri has drawn on European styles". More appropriately Béhague comments: "more advanced techniques of composition appeared in some of the works of Gerardo Guevara". A prolific composer, he has also written essays and articles on music. As a teacher he also had a profound influence on his students.

Works
Inspiración for piano, 1950 (world premiere 2011 by Alex Alarcon Fabre)
Despedida, pasillo, 1957
Apanny Shungo for piano, 1958
 Yaguar shungo ballet for symphony orchestra and choir 1958
Geografía for baritone and piano (texts by Jorge Enrique Adoum), 1960
Tierras for baritone and piano (text by Jorge Carrera Andrade), 1960
First string quartet, 1960
El Hombre Planetario for baritone and piano (texts by Carrera Andrade), 1962
Tres preludios for piano: Recitativo, Albazo and Sanjuanito, 1963
Cantata de la paz for baritone, orchestra and choir 1963-64
Second string quartet, 1963–64
Atahualpa for choir, 1965
Indios for choir, 1965
Se va con algo mío, pasillo, 1967
Danzante del destino, for pinkillu, pan flute, harp, bombo, 2 guitars, contralto solo, choir,  1967
Danzante de la Ausencia, choir, 1967
Yaraví del desterrado, 1967
Tuyallay, 1967
Ismos for violin, viola, cello, oboe, clarinet and piano, 1970
Ecuador, orchestral suite, 1972
5 Miniaturas (Panecillo, Pichincha, La Compañía, Avenida Veinticuatro de Mayo, Quito Norte) for flute, French horn, oboe, clarinet and fagot, 1973
Quito arrabal del cielo for choir (text by Jorge Reyes), 1974
Galería siglo XX de pintores ecuatorianos, orchestral suite, 1976
El Panecillo, (texts by Eloy Proaño), 1977
Solsticio de Verano, san juanito, 1977
Tres melodías para soprano y orquesta de cámara texts by Ana María Iza (Iba a fugarme, Pasillo, Aquí me paro y grito), 1978
Tríptico for choir, 1978
El espantapájaros,
Jaguay, vocal, 1980
Combate poético for baritone and piano, 1980
Otoño for voice and piano, 1980
Fiesta for piano, 1982
Diálogos for flute, piano (dedicated to Luciano Carrera), 1982
Recitativo and Danza for guitar, 1983
Juegos, 1983
Suite Ecuatoriana, for flute and piano1985
Cuaderno pedagógico for piano students, 1985–86
 Et in Terra Pax Hominibus for baritone and orchestra, text by J. E. Adoum, 1987
Huayra Shina for soprano, baritone and orchestra, 1987
pasillo for piano, 1988
Historia for orchestra, 1990.
Del maíz al trigo (tonada), 1993.
De mestizo a mestizo for orchestra (in three movements), 1994

Discography
 Gerardo Guevara: Melodías y canciones.  Galo Cárdenas, Baritone;  Marie Renée Portais, piano.  Fediscos
Lp 5403, 1982.
Música de nuestro tiempo, Ifesa (LP 301-0293)
Gerardo Guevara: Et in Terra Pax Hominibus for baritone & orchestra, text by Jorge Enrique Adoum.
other works by: M. Estévez, D. Luzuriaga, M. Maiguashca & A. Rodas
 Orquesta Sinfónica Nacional conducted by Alvaro Manzano
Despedida, Ifesa Lp-CME.  Guayaquil 1958. Piano: Gerardo Gevara.
Se va con algo mío in: Beatriz Parra, Noche lírica en Canal 2, record no. 2, IFESA Lp-206-B.  Guayaquil, 1973.
Danzante del destino. Victor 45 rpm PB9027. Sweden, 1977.
Grandes temas de Música Ecuatoriana
Gerardo Guevara, El Espantapájaros
other works by: Sixto María Durán, Benítez & Valencia, etc
Piano, Marcelo Ortiz
 Souvenir de l'Amérique du Sud CD.  Piano: Marcelo Ortiz
Pasillo (pasillo) (Gerardo Guevara)
Fiesta (albazo) (Gerardo Guevara)
Tonada (tonada) (Gerardo Guevara)
El espantapájaros (pasillo) (Gerardo Guevara)
Apamuy Shungo (danzante) (Gerardo Guevara)
Other works by: Luis H. Salgado, Enrique Espín Yépez, Sixto M. Durán, Miguel A. Casares
 Piano Music by Ecuadorian Composers CD.  Piano: [Alex Alarcon Fabre],
Pasillo (pasillo) (Gerardo Guevara)
Fiesta (aire tipico) (Gerardo Guevara)
Albazo (albazo) (Gerardo Guevara)
Other works by: Luis H. Salgado, Claudio Aizaga, Corsino Durán, Juan Pablo Muñoz Sanz

Bibliography
"Gerardo Guevara", in: Grandes compositores ecuatorianos, edited by Pablo Guerrero (G. CONMÚSICA, 1999)
 Béhague, Gerard: "Ecuador. Art Music", in: The New Grove Dictionary of Music and Musicians, Second edition, edited by Stanley Sadie & John Tyrrel (London: Macmillan, 2001)
Pérez Pimentel, Rodolfo:  Diccionario Biografico Ecuatoriano 
 Stevenson, Robert: "Quito", in: The New Grove Dictionary of Music and Musicians, Second edition, edited by Stanley Sadie & John Tyrrel (London: Macmillan, 2001)
Walker, John L.: "The Younger Generation of Ecuadorian Composers", in: Latin American Music Review vol. 22, no. 2 (Fall/Winter 2001), pp. 199–213

Writings
"La música coral en Ecuador", in: Diners no. 1, March 1980, pp. 30-33 (Quito: Diners Club del Ecuador)
"Segunda Sonata para piano de Luis H. Salgado", in: Opus, vol. 3, no. 31, pp. 48–51 (Quito: Central Bank of Ecuador)
Vamos a cantar: cancionero popula (Quito: Ministerio de Educación y Cultura, 1991; repr. 1992)

References

External links
 Homage to Gerardo Guevara Fundación Filarmónica y Casa de la Música
di-arezzo scores, Spain Six songs by Gerardo guevara
The Art Song in Latin America: Selected Works by Twentieth-Century Composers Latin-American choral scores.

1930 births
20th-century classical composers
Ecuadorian composers
Living people
Male classical composers
People from Quito
École Normale de Musique de Paris alumni
20th-century male musicians